Gdańska Street is one of the main streets of downtown Bydgoszcz, Poland. Initially, the street was a thoroughfare, but in the second half of the 19th century, it turned residential.  It ran from the Brda river to Bydgoszcz northern part of town and has gradually become the city center of trade and entertainment. During the interwar period, Gdańska street was the third longest street in Bydgoszcz with a total length of 3.19 km.

The street connects the Old Town Road with the northern areas of Bydgoszcz agglomeration. The southern part is the real "vertebrate column" of Bydgoszcz downtown and the most architecturally representative, while the northern part - from the Municipal Stadium to the southern boundaries of the city- is bordered by Forest Park of Culture and Leisure and the Gdańsk Forest. Rich architecturally, Gdańska Street has got many buildings registered on the Kuyavian-Pomeranian Voivodeship Heritage list.

History
Gdańska street was laid in the 1820s, following the old route leading to Gdańsk (parallel to Pomorska street). The creation of the street is associated with the expansion of the city to the north, which happened after 1816, when the city bought the land east of the route to Gdańsk. The thoroughfare has been designed as a straight line, 26 meters wide: the land on both sides was then divided into plots, which became the property of individuals. At the beginning suburbs were limited to the area delimited by the bridge on the Brda River, Gdańsk Gates, Carmelite Church (now Theatre Square) and the Old Church of the Holy Spirit (now Poor Clares' Church). 
The area has been the place where downtown townspeople used for their annual shooting competition, awarded by the "Golden Hen" badge". 
The first intersection in Gdańska street - with Dworcowa street and Pomorska street - is located at the medieval road fork leading to Koronowo.

The pace of urban center development to the north-west has increased from 1850 on, after the construction of Railway Main Station in Bocianowo district which became city area. Gdańska street quickly became a central representative thoroughfare, and developed as a new city.

Inextricably linked with the development of the street was the construction of cross and parallel streets, enabling Gdańska street to connect to downtown district (on the other side of Brda river), the Bocianowo district to the west, and Grodztwo, Bielawy and Forest ( Leśne) districts to the east. This network of adjacent streets was created between 1850 and the early years of the 20th century. The only surviving old streets lattice, dating back to the Middle Ages, consists of Focha, Jagiellońska, Dworcowa and Pomorska streets.

Important milestones in the evolution of Gdańska street were the setting up of Freedom Square in 1854, and Adam Mickiewicz Alley in 1903, since they particularly influenced sections of Gdańska street in these areas.
On Freedom Square has been established consecutively: in 1876 the Evangelical parish church; in 1893 an equestrian statue of Kaiser Wilhelm I; and in 1904 a monumental fountain. After 1854, in the western part of the street -between Artyleryjska street and Powstańców Warszawy street- was created a training and shooting area, which resulted in the development of the so-called "Barracks area". In 1861, the newly built Warsaw-Bydgoszcz railway line crossed Gdańska street at Artyleryjska street, cutting off those military areas and putting a provisional end to the northern extension. It was only in the 1930s, after a level crossing had been established, that further developments towards Forest district could resume.

Street attractiveness declined after World War II. After 1996, a gradual revitalization began. In 1998, initial sections of the street (from downtown to Freedom Square) had their car traffic significantly reduced. In 2002–2007, a modernization of the pavement was performed, as well as roads and streetcar railways, and stylish lighting has been installed.
Continuous work is also underway to restore buildings facades and interiors.
In 2005 and 2006, two sculptures by Michał Kubiak were unveiled: "The Wanderer" and "Marian Rejewski on a bench".

Naming
Since Gdańska Street was formed in two steps, it had originally two names. Its primary section - from Brda river to Dworcowa street -  dating back to the 14th century, was called Gdańska street, while the extension that started in 1820 was named Road of Gdańsk. Later, with urban development, Gdańska street was the denomination of subsequent extensions (in 1879 it stretched to Warsaw Uprising street intersection). In 1977, the street reached its current administrative length and borders, and therefore "Gdańska street" indicates now the road leading from Bydgoszcz Old Town up to the northern boundary of the city.

Successive names of the street in its historic section are as follows:* 1820-1920 – Danziger Straße / Danziger Chaussee; 1920-1939 – Gdańska street; 1939-1945 – Adolf-Hitler-Straße; 1945-1990 – 1 May Avenue, and since 1990 – Gdańska street.

Tract division
Once Gdańska street set up, the land situated on both sides has been divided into plots and sold to individuals. Probably most of the plots all the way to Świętojańskia street, has been drawn around the 1850s and their limits are still the same today. The parcelling process of properties on Gdańska street and their numbering was finally completed in February 1931, followed by the administrative imposition for even-numbered (eastern side) and odd ones (on the west). Between 1879 and 1931, 169 numbers were registered and since 1931, 190 are in use in total. Following adjustments were related to the further development of the street to the north, especially on the eastern side. Currently, the highest administrative number is 260, corresponding to the Forest district ("Myślęcinek") area.

Development of buildings and means of communication
The origins of road construction dates back to 1448, when were erected the buildings of the Old Church and Hospital of the Holy Spirit (now Poor Clares' Church), just on the immediate northern side of the river.
In 1615, the Church of Rome took over the Order of Saint Clare, which had a significant impact on the Poor Clares' Church architecture: until the mid-17th century, the building was redesigned in the late Gothic - Renaissance style and the sublime monastery's cloister connected with the temple.
At the end of the 18th century, there were several residential buildings along Gdańska street: in addition to the Church, an inn was standing at the crossroads with the road to Koronowo and Świecie. 
In 1816, Gliszczyński family established another inn at the location of the current Hotel "Pod Orlem".

The rapid development of building frontage along the entire length of Gdańska street took place after 1835. 
Around 1860, edifices extended up to the crossing with Śniadeckich street, then in 1870 up to the Świętojański street, while basic, core building across Kamienna street -where there was a level crossing- was established in 1890.

After 1900 were built the first large buildings in the northern part of the street including: Water Supply station (1899-1900); War College building (1913-1914);  buildings within the newly created Forest district after 1933, like houses at Nr.208 to 238. In the 1950s, new buildings in Osiedle Leśne have been constructed, such as the "Zawisza" WKS sports complex.

In 1860, the street began to be illuminated with gas lanterns, and with electric lights since 1900. Street on the entire length of the road had paved surfaces, separating curbs, along with a tree line. The sidewalks were laid from granite boards.
On May 18, 1888, was launched a horsepowered tram, along the so-called "Red" line (from Theatre Square to Dworcowa street) and in 1892 a second line, "Green", has been launched (along the entire length of Gdańska street to the artillery barracks).
Trams were electrified in 1896, and in 1937, in connection with the creation of the district Forest, a bus line has been launched.

In 1932, with the construction of Polish Coal Trunk-Line, a viaduct has been built over the railway (named after Józef Święcicki), has been rebuilt in 1968 and 2006, and the level crossing was closed. In 1989, a viaduct was built for the tram and a tram terminal set up in the immediate vicinity of the Forest Park of Culture and Leisure, at the intersection with Rekreacyjna street. In 2012 first contraflow lanes for cyclists have appeared in Gdańska street.

Architecture 
The landscape of Gdańska street has remained unchanged for over 150 years. Be that as it may, the lengthy construction process made the ensemble of the whole street much diversified. Adjacent houses, hence, generally come from different eras, with different scales and styles. Originally sections up to Świętojańska street consisted mainly of tenements for rent, and further north were reserved plots for construction of grander buildings with front-garden.
Between 1890 and 1914 a significant increased number of grandiose buildings were constructed including: nine grand habitation houses, at Nr.16, 27, 30, 34, 51, 55, 63, 62 and 95; and several reconstructed or built villas for rich industrialists and bureaucrats, like at Nr.48 & 50, with dominant architectural importance.

Until the end of the 19th century, the predominant style was Neo-Classicism: tenements were built with simple, symmetrical facades and usually modest decoration. In the last quarter of the 19th century, classicism forms were tinged with Neo-Renaissance, Neo-Gothic and Neo-Baroque elements.

Between 1885 and 1898,  Bydgoszcz's architect Józef Święcicki built 21 edifices along Gdańska street, and associated Eclecticism with different new styles: some of his projects permanently etched the street landscape with Neo-Baroque designs, such as Nr.14, 36, 63, or 1 Freedom Square. Best instance is Hotel Pod Orlem at 1 Gdańska street which is now a real showcase of Bydgoszcz's architecture.

At the beginning of the 20th century, houses were built following German Historicism, pioneering architecture style. As such, specific architects possessed their own characteristics: Fritz Weidner represented the picturesque current; Rudolf Kern, the German Secession; Alfred Schleusener and Paul Sellner the early Modern Architecture.

Houses built in the 1930s in the northern part of the street follows so-called International Style with simple cubic lumps, like Jan Kossowski's works. After World War II, building architecture was styleless, as displayed in the features from this period: Supermarket "Rywal" (1971-1973) at Nr.47 or three typical houses at Nr.23, 53 & 76. Three new edifices have been erected between 1990 and 2005 in Gdańska Street, Nr.121, 125 & 139, none of which fits into a proper style regarding the surrounding buildings.

At the eve of the 20th century, several architecturally interesting buildings, referring to Eclecticism and Art Nouveau, rose in the network of adjacent streets buildings. Such realizations can be found mainly in following places: Krasinski St., Słowacki St., Adam Mickiewicz Alley, Cieszkowski Street, Paderewski Street, Weyssenhoff Square, 20 January 1920 Street and partly in buildings around Świętojańskiego St., Zamoyskiego St. and Chodkiewicza St.

Social Role 

The role of Gdańska Street, till 1850, was principally that of a means of communication; after this date, it became a representative, bourgeois area and the expanding axis of downtown Bydgoszcz. The buildings giving onto the street have been housing a mix of wealthy representative officials, manufacturers and traders of different professions, whereas craftsmen and laborers lived in the outbuildings and more modest homes. Habitation ground floors were generally designed to house commercial or catering service.

The area of Gdańska Street soon experienced a booming trade expansion: craft workshops developed -20 tailors and 25 shoemakers were referenced in the street at the end of the 19th century, as well as small industry and gastronomy. Nonetheless, the street did not suffer from any rapid industrialization process: very few companies (with the exception of G. Rady's factory of artistic metalwork in 1896) did build typical factory buildings on this axis. The only companies operating in the area were quite modest and housed in buildings backyards.

The shop on Gdańska street which has the longest history is the pharmacy "Under the Swan", located at Nr.5 since 1853. At the beginning of the 20th century, department stores began to appear: in 1910, Modehaus Bromberg lasted a couple of years in 1911, Department Store "Kaufhaus Conitzer & Söhne"; in 1919, Boniface Cyrus shop. At the beginning of the 20th century, the street was also the address of 5 banks seat.

Gdańska Street had also an important role in catering and entertainment business. During the 19th century and first half of the 20th century, it was the venue of restaurants and cafés for wealthy people, locations for modest retailshops, brasseries, as well as concert halls, hotels, theaters, cinemas. The street also housed the first seat of Provincial and Municipal Public Library at Nr.27.

Street Festival
Each September, since 2002, the "Gdańska Street Festival" ( Święto Ulicy Gdańskiej) is the time for outdoor events, concerts and competitions held in different places and buildings along the street. The main organizer of the event is Bydgoszcz's branch of Gazeta Wyborcza.

The street today 
Gdańska Street is 7.3 kilometers long, with a 2 km long stylish houses section, and 1.5 km away to the north the city's barracks and the forest district. In fact the 3.8 km long stretch of road located north of the railway viaduct has a completely different character from the urbanized one, between Gdańsk forest and the Culture and Leisure Forest Park. On the northern outskirts of the city, the street climbs up the 45-meter high Fordoński rising.

Along Gdańska street one will find: three churches; four museums (District museum, Pharmacy museum, Museum of the Army and Sports museum); concert halls (Academy of Music, "Club Mózg") and the seat of Radio PIK; the oldest hotel of the city  (Hotel "Pod Orlem"); one of the oldest department stores, the Department Store "Jedynak" built on the like of Berlin and Paris department stores at the beginning of the 20th century; landscape architecture, including "Marian Rejewski on a bench" and "The Wanderer", as well as two sculptures created with dead trees Woman in pigeons at Nr.30 and As soon as we play at the intersection of Gdańska St. and Słowacki Street. A third sculpture, "The Awakening elves", can be found right in Jan Kochanowski Park near Adam Mickiewicz Alley: a modern shopping mall; the 5 villas and about 145 houses, 50 of which have richly decorated facades in styles referring to the Neo-Renaissance, Neo-Gothic, Neo-Baroque, German Historicism, Secession and Modern architecture; as well as the monumental military school building, the headquarters of Pomeranian Military District, the building that housed NATO Training Center from 2004 to 2010 and the Inspectorate for Logistic Armed Forces; an old water supply station from 1900; a group of military barracks from the second half of the 19th century; the largest sports complex in the city; the largest leisure city park in Poland (city park "Myślęcinek"); and the Honorary Consulate of Ukraine (at Nr.76).

Architecture
A walk through Gdańska Street and nearby areas gives an overview of styles and trends of last two centuries construction style. One-storey houses (representing suburban housing type) mix with two and three story tenements (close to 100 of them), as well as urban four and five story buildings and monumental buildings. More than 90% of the building in Gdańska Street dates back from before 1920. Half of them have been built or rebuilt in the years 1890–1914, when wealthy Bydgoszcz inhabitants put proudness in architecture, fashioning different styles, from Neo-Renaissance, Neo-Gothic, Neo-Baroque, to Secession and early Modern architecture.

Buildings along Gdańska Street are realizations of Bydgoszcz/Bromberg's most prominent architects, including: Józef Święcicki (21 buildings, 20 still left); Fritz Weidner - 8 buildings; Rudolf Kern - 7 buildings; Karl Bergner - 5 buildings; Alfred Schleusener - 3 buildings; Carl Rose - 2 buildings; Paul Sellner - 2 buildings. Some of them were architects from Berlin, like Heinrich Seeling, Otto Walther or W. Hildebrandt.

In side streets, there are a large number of tenements constructed before 1914: over 30 tenements by Joseph Święcicki, 19 from Rudolf Kern, 14 from Fritz Weidner and a number of them by other builders (i.e. Karl Bergner, Paul Böhm, Erich Lindenburger).

Monuments and main edifices
In 2007, 27 buildings located on Gdańska street were registered on the Pomeranian Heritage List.

The oldest preserved building is from the end of the 16th century to the beginning of the 17th century: the Church of the Poor Clares. However, the vast majority of monuments comprises stylish townhouses have been built between 1880 and 1914.

Poor Clares' Church at 2, corner with Jagiellońska street
Registered on Kuyavian-Pomeranian Voivodeship Heritage List (Nr.601229 Reg.A/209), 31 March 1931 Built in 1582-1602 & 1618–1645.

Gothic-Renaissance-Baroque. 

The oldest building in Gdańska Street, it has been used as a warehouse and a fire station during Prussian times.

Max Zweininger Tenement, at 2 Focha Street
Built in 1901–1902, by Karl Bergner

Vienna Secession

The house was built for Max Zweininger, the owner of a famous hat manufactory in Bromberg, located on the square. In 1940, arcades have been added on a design by Jan Kossowski.

Building of the District Museum, at 4
Registered on Kuyavian-Pomeranian Voivodeship Heritage List: Nr.601230, reg.A/278, 22nd Jan. 1953 and 12 May 1993. Built in 1550–1618, then rebuilt in 1878 by Alexander Lincke.

Neo-Renaissance-Mannerism.

Originally part of the former monastery of the Poor Clares, the building has been used as a municipal hospital and has received an additional wing along the Gdańska street in 1878, with Neo-Renaissance and Mannerism styles.

August Mentzel Tenement, at 5
Built in 1853-1863 and 1909 by Rudolf Kern

Vienna Secession.

The ground floor of the building still houses one of the oldest pharmacies of Bydgoszcz, "Pod Łabędziem" (Under the Swan) and a Pharmacy Museum.

Drukarnia" shopping mall, at 6/8
Built in 2007, by JSK Architects

Modern Architecture

At this location one of the biggest printhouse in Poland.

Tenement at 7 
Built in the 1860s

Historicism & Neoclassicism.
At Danziger str.7 around 1850 it was L Basilius photogr.-artis studio. 
The building has been erected for commercial purposes, especially allowing shopping room on the ground floor. Julius Musolff has been running a business since 1872 until World War I. Later on, P. Riemer nad been running a sports equipment shop there.

Tenement at 9 
1875-1900

Eclecticism & Neoclassicism forms.

In 1868, there was housed Kreski family's store and warehouses. At the time, it contained Bromberg's largest selection of porcelain and lamps. The shop closed at the end of the 1930s. 
In 1905, Emil Warmiński opened there his medical cabinet, one of the first to display a Polish language plaque at the time of Prussian occupation.

The building also housed the photography workshop of Joop Theodor, one of the largest in the city. Theodor also had studios also in Gdańsk and Torun, running his own firm (Theodor Joop & Company). This workshop was later used by the photographer Lorenzo Basilius.
From 1909 until the end of the 1930s, "Centrala Optyczna", an optical shop run by Mr Zakaszewski was installed here, together with a fur shop in the 1920s. In 1945, the backyard of the tenement housed "Dekora", an art studio.

The building is adorned with two niched statues on the first level of the facade representing feminine allegories of Trade and Industry.

Ernst Mix Tenement, at 10
Built in 1863-1905 and 1913–1914, by Fritz Weidner

Early Modern Architecture.

Originally a soap factory, it has, later on, housed a Department store and a movie theatre till 2003.

Tenement at 11 
1875-1900

Built by Józef Święcicki, Eclecticism & Neoclassicism.

In 1887 the landlord, merchant Carl Walle had the house extended with a residential wing designed by architect Joseph Święcicki.

Frontage style is a continuity of adjacent building (Nr.9), with adorned panels, friezes of angels and meander motifs.

Tenement at 12 
ca 1860

Historicism

The tenement is on the corner with Parkowa street. The facade has still got many preserved and diverse architectural details: delicately adorned bay window on the corner of the building, window pediments on the second floor and fake-column decoration on each side of first floor windows.

Tenement at 13 
ca. 1875–1900.

Neoclassicism.

This plot near the intersection with Dworcowa Street belonged to the family Pawlikowski, who were hoteliers in Bromberg in the second half of the 19th century. In 1882, Pawlikowski built an eclectic arrangement of building frontages, with reference to neoclassicism.

One can notice the decoratively designed gate, the pediments above middle windows, the balcony with its adorned balustrade. The façade is crowned by a frieze with a rich decoration.

Hotel Pod Orłem, at 14
Registered on Kuyavian-Pomeranian Voivodeship heritage list: Nr.601295-reg.90/A, 15 December 1974.

Built in 1893-1896 by Józef Święcicki, rebuilt in 1926, 1939, 1987.

Eclectism & Neo-Baroque.

The oldest hotel in Bydgoszcz, still in business. It is now a 4-star rated facility.

|

Department Store "Jedynak", at 15
Registered on Kuyavian-Pomeranian Voivodeship heritage list: Nt.601296-reg.87/A, 10 December 1971.

Built in 1910-1911 by Otto Walter

Modern Architecture.

One of the first Department Store built in Bydgoszcz, it pioneered the use of reinforced concrete in a modern design.

Emil Bernhardt tenement, at 16
Registered on Kuyavian-Pomeranian Voivodeship heritage list: Nr.735497-reg.A/1558, 30 April 2010.

Built in 1882-1884 by Carl Stampehl

Eclecticism.

Emil Bernhardt was the founder of adjacent Hotel Pod Orłem at 14.

Alexander Timm House at 17, corner with Pomorska Street
Built in 1852 by B. Brinkmann, and 1910 by O.F.W. Muller

Eclecticism & Neoclassicism.

At the time of its erection, it was the largest habitation house in Bydgoszcz.

The Pomeranian Arts House, at 20
Registered on Kuyavian-Pomeranian Voivodeship heritage list, Nr.601297-Reg.A/1116, 18 November 1993

Built in 1886–1887, by Gustaw Reichert, and renovated in 1908 and 1965

German Historism

The building housed successively German cultural associations (1887-1939), Polish unions, Bydgoszcz Opera Music Theatre (1945-2006), the National School of Fine Arts (till 1982). Since 2006, it is owned by the Bydgoszcz Music Academy "Feliks Nowowiejski".

St Peter's and St Paul's Church, Freedom Square
Registered on Kuyavian-Pomeranian Voivodeship heritage list: Nr.601297-Reg.A/1116, 18 November 1993.

Built in 1872-1878 by Friedrich Adler

Eclecticism, Neo-Gothic & Neo-Romanesque.

It was a Protestant church until 1945.

Tenement at 1 Freedom Square, corner with Gdańsk Street 
Registered on Kuyavian-Pomeranian Voivodeship heritage list: Nr.601429-Reg.A/1041, October 20, 1990.

Built in 1896-1898 by Józef Święcicki

Eclecticism & Neo-baroque.

One of the most iconic buildings in downtown Bydgoszcz.

Tenement at 21 
1850–1875,

Eclecticism & Neoclassicism

Initially referenced at Danzigerstraße 15, its first landlord was Albert Kernke, an hydrant man. In the 1930s, the place hosted a dancing cabaret, the Jockey-Club.

The facade still displays remnants of neoclassical architecture.

Tenement at 22 
Registered on Kuyavian-Pomeranian Voivodeship heritage list: Nr.601298-Reg.A/987, May 28, 1991.

Built in 1850-1875 by Carl Stampehl and renovated in 1883.

Eclecticism.

A renovation was conducted by architect Rudolf Kern from 1910 to 1911.

Tenement at 23 
Built between 1947 and 1949

Modern architecture

At the time, the building has been erected especially to house PKO local seat.

Tenement at 24 
Built in 1906-1907 by Rudolf Kern

Eclecticism.

Although devoid of architectural motifs and decoration, the highly simplified shape of the building is a remnant of the one erected in the early 1900s by architect Rudolf Kern, on an order from investor Julius Berger. The building housed the first Music Conservatoire of Bydgoszcz, founded in 1904 by Arnold Schattschneider. 
In 1926, one of the first Polish car dealer and fuel station were set up here, the Ford Butowski Company.

Originally, this five-storey tenement possessed rich Art Nouveau architectural details but has been heavily destroyed by a fire in 1945. 
The facade underwent a thorough restoration in 2018.

Tenement at 25 
1850–1875.

Eclecticism.

The tenement at was first own by Carl Weißenborn, a judge: address was then Danzigerstraße 18. On December 25, 1909, Wacław Szkaradkiewicz opened here a 360-seat movie theatre, called Corso, then Bałtyk in 1932.

Tenement at 26 
Early 20th century

Eclecticism.

First owner at then Danzigerstraße 157 was Ernst Winkler, an upholsterer, running the company Winkler & Hübner.

The whole facade decoration has been lost. One can still notice the wrought iron balcony and the renovated iron cast portal located at the bottom of the left avant-corps.

Carl Meinhardt Tenement, at 27
Built in 1908-1909 by Alfred Schleusener and renovated in 1974 and 2003

Modern architecture.

In 1934, a statue adorning the summit of the façade fell and killed two people. A major restoration of the building has been carried out in 2003.

Thomas Frankowski Tenement, at 28
Registered on Kuyavian-Pomeranian Voivodeship heritage list: Nr.748678-Reg.A/1582, February 16, 2011

Built in 1897-1898 by Fritz Weidner

German historicism.

The house was commissioned by Thomas Frankowski, a rentier. Architectural style displays forms of German historicism, in a transitional phase between the eclecticism and secession.

Tenement at 29 
1880s

Eclecticism

The left part of the facade is adorned with a two-story bay window enclosed in pilasters and columns with Corinthian capitals. The building is topped by a cornice supported by massive corbels.

At the end of the 19th century, George Sikorski ran his barber business there. In April 1924, it was the first place Józef Weyssenhoff, a Polish writer, novelist, poet, literary critic, publisher, lived in when he moved from Warsaw.

Oskar Ewald Tenement at 30, corner with Krasiński Street
Built in 1895-1896 by Józef Święcicki

Eclecticism.

The top floor housed originally Oskar Ewald's photographic studio.

George Sikorski Tenement at 31
Built in 1902–1903, by Fritz Weidner

German Historicism.

This building was commissioned by George Sikorski as a habitation house.

Hermann Berndt Tenement, at 32
Built in 1881, and 1910–1911 by Erich Lindenburger

Eclecticism & Neo-Renaissance

Hermann Berndt, a master carpenter owner of the plot had the original house built around 1881. He commissioned, in 1899, an expansion to the south, adding the gate and bay windows with loggias. The house was refitted again in 1910–1911, on a design by Erich Lindenburger, as requested by new landlord Leo Venske.

Tenement at 33 
Registered on Kuyavian-Pomeranian Voivodeship heritage list, Nr.601300-Reg.A/742, January 15, 1986.

Built in 1876-1878

Eclecticism & Neo-Baroque. 

The facade is highly decorated, echoing in a way the facing building.

Tenement at 2 Krasiński Street 
Registered on Kuyavian-Pomeranian Voivodeship heritage list, Nr.601371-Reg.A/1090, December 15, 1993

Built in 1912 by Franz Julius Knüpfer

Modern architecture.

The house originally housed commercial premises on the ground floor.

Fritz Weidner tenement at 34
Built in 1910 by Fritz Weidner

German Historicism.

The home of the architect Fritz Weidner from 1912 on.

Julius Grey house at 35
Built in 1887 by Hermann Lewandowski and in 1909 by Rudolf Kern

Eclecticism

Until 2003, the Cristal café with a typical Art Nouveau décor has been located here.

Theonia Reichhardt House at 36
Built in 1875 by Józef Święcicki, then renovated in 1898

Eclecticism & Neo-baroque

In one of the cartouche above a balcony of the second floor, a letter R (for Reichhardt family) is apparent.

Tenement at 37 
Built in 1853 by Friedrich Meyer

Eclecticism

The building originally had only one storey at midsection, hence the presence of decoration on this level: rosette adornements with trefoil motifs. Before the building in 1924 was set a petrol station run by SA Gasoline in Lviv. The house underwent a thorough renovation in 2015–2016.

Tenement at 38 
Built ca. 1905 by Józef Święcicki

Eclecticism.

The architect Carl Rose, owner of the house around 1906, may have taken part to its design.
The building shows atypical arrangement on the lower part of the facade, with high Corinthian half-columns and semicircular small balcony with a decorative wrought iron Latticework. The plot was used initially as a hothouse for the gardener of Stanisław Miaskowski, landlord at Nr.40.

Marian Rejewski Square, crossing with Śniadecki Street
2005

This small green area has been named after Marian Rejewski, an eminent mathematician born in Bromberg on August 16, 1905. 
In 2005, Bydgoszcz municipality unveiled a memorial in this square to celebrate the centennial of Rejewski's birth. It resembles the Alan Turing Memorial in Manchester unveiled in 2001.

Stanisław Miaskowski House at 40
Built in 1852 by Trieb

One of the oldest preserved in its original form on Gdańska Street

Max Rosenthal Tenement at 42
Registered on Kuyavian-Pomeranian Voivodeship heritage list, Nr.601299-Reg.A/1059, August 26, 1996.

Built in 1905-1906 by Fritz Weidner

German Historicism.

The house has been erected following a commission from the shipping investor Max Rosenthal.

Tenement at 44 
Built in 1867

Its commissioner was Karl Schmidt, a rentier. House's address was then Danzigerstraße 55.

Recently renovated, the facade displays eclectic features.

Villa Heinrich Dietz at 48
Registered on Kuyavian-Pomeranian Voivodeship heritage list, Nr.601301-Reg.A/1128/1-4, July 7, 1992 and September 29, 1998.

Built in 1897-1898 by Heinrich Seeling

Eclecticism & Neo-Gothic

The villa is nicknamed Villa Flora, related to rich murals adorning of the gone loggia.

Tenement at 49 
1860s

Eclecticism

The house, at then Danzigerstraße 28, was built for a merchant, Henriette Kayka. She lived there till the end of the 19th century. In the 1920s, the house housed a restaurant, run by Edward Beidatsch.

This building, low compared to its neighbours, recalls others in downtown, built in the same time period, such as Gdańska street 37, 40 or Focha street 6. On the facade, the first level still retains some interesting features, like thin pediments and corbels. In addition, the main door shows exquisite wood carved motifs and pilasters with wrought iron elements.

Villa Wilhelm Blumwe at 50
Registered on Kuyavian-Pomeranian Voivodeship heritage list, Nr.601301-Reg.A/1128/1-4, July 7, 1992 and September 29, 1998.

Built in 1900-1904 by Hildebrandt

Neo-Renaissance.

On top of the building facade stood from 1901 till 1940, an urn with Carl Blumwe's ashes, the father of the owner.

Carl Rose Tenement at 51
Built in 1903-1904 by Carl Rose

Eclecticism & Art Nouveau.

The architect Carl Rose lived and worked there until 1920.

Robert Grundtmann Tenement at 1 Słowacki Street
Built in 1905–1906, by Alfred Schleusener

Early Modern architecture.

The building housed one of Bydgoszcz's most famous cafe: Cafe Metropol.

Tenement at 52 
1878

Neo-Classicism and Eclecticism.

The house was built for a gardener, Carl Berndt, also owner of Nr.54.

The elevation features some delicate, architectural details: figures in the cartouche at the bottom of first and second floor windows, trianguler pediments and a slight avant-corps to underline the symmetry of the facade. The frontage underwent a thorough overhaul during summer 2016.

Tenement at 54 
Built in 1876 by Ferdinand Wiese and Joseph Stark, in 1926 by Paul Kuklinski

Eclecticism & Neo-Renaissance

The house was built for the gardener of Carl Berndt, owner of Nr.52. It has housed the Music School of Bydgoszcz from 1945 to the late 1950s.

The harmonious and symmetrical façade displays Corinthian pilasters, decorated cornice and a frieze with a stylized plant motifs and tonda decorated with the head of a boy. In 1926, the front of the building was rebuilt and adapted for commercial purposes, on a design by architect Paul Kuklinski. The entire edifice was renovated in 2018.

Chapel of the Sisters of the Poor Clares, at 56
1899

Modern architecture

Since February 16, 1946, a lifetime adoration is performed in the chapel.

Tenement at 57 
1870s

Eclecticism

First recorded landlord, at then Danzigerstraße 32, was Johann Stößel.

The building has undergone a profound renovation in the late 2018.

Aleksander Olszyński Tenement, at 58
1894–1895, by Henrich Arndt

Neo-Renaissance, Neo-Baroque & Eclecticism

One can notice a preserved and rich Neo-Renaissance and Neo-Baroque stucco decoration on the facade.

Carl Meyer tenement, at 60
1891–1892, by Carl Meyer

Eclecticism

A facade niche houses a sculpted allegory of Architecture and Construction.

Alfred Schleusener Tenement, at 62
1910–1911, by Alfred Schleusener

Modern architecture

The architect Alfred Schleusener lived and worked there till 1944.

Józef Święcicki tenement at 63
Registered on Kuyavian-Pomeranian Voivodeship heritage list, Nr.601299-Reg.A/1059, August 26, 1996.

Built in 1895–1897, by Józef Święcicki

Eclecticism, Neo-Renaissance & Neo-Baroque.

House of architect Józef Święcicki, where he lived with his family and ran his business.

Tenement at 64 
September 1889

Eclecticism.

First landlord at then Danzigerstraße 136 was Józef Swięcicki, a building construction manager. It passed then to Hermann Bluementhal "the joung", a merchant and then to Bruno Straszewski, a horse dealer till the end of World War I.

The high elevation displays Eclectic style: neo-classic details (pedimented windows, symmetry, pilasters), bossage on the ground floor or a man figure placed at keystone position of the right arched window.

Eduard Schulz Tenement at 66/68
Built in 1904–1905, by Rudolf Kern

Art Nouveau

In 1949, in the back garden, was built the actual Polish Theatre.

Tenement at 67 
1910–1911, by Rudolf Kern

Modern architecture & Art Nouveau

The building presents characteristics of the first decade of the 20th century with early forms of modern architecture.

Tenement at 69 
1896, by Józef Święcicki

Eclecticism & Neo-Gothic.

The tenement has been commissioned by Ludwik Winnicki, a merchant dealing in flour, so as to get a living and commercial building. Soon after completion, the stepfather of Józef Święcicki, Anton Hoffmann moved and lived there with his family (1897-1900).

In the first version, the facade had a rich stucco decor. A later refurbishing resulted in a complete changes of the front elevation. Noticeable are the heads of dragons above the gate, supporting the central bay window.

Tenement at 71 
1906–1908, by Rudolf Kern

Modern architecture & Eclecticism

It has been the seat of the Municipal Conservatoire since 1939.

Rudolf Kern Building at 1 Adam Mickiewicz Alley
Registered on Kuyavian-Pomeranian Voivodeship heritage list, Nr.601377-Reg.A/1086, November 20, 1995.

1903–1904, by Rudolf Kern

Art Nouveau 

House of architect Rudolf Kern,  for his own use, private and business: he has lived there until 1922.

House at 74 
1883

First registered landlord was Friedrich Wodtke.
House features (clear lines, dormers) recall similar ones in Gdańska (e.g. at 37 or 40).

Tenement at 75 
1883

eclecticism & Neo-Classicism Registered on Kuyavian-Pomeranian Voivodeship heritage list, Nr.601310-Reg.A/893, November 12, 1992

A frontispiece adorned with a Hermes's head overhangs the gate.

Tenement at 77 
1885.

Eclecticism & Neoclassical Architecture.

The tenement at then Danzigerstraße 45, has been commissioned by a merchant, Karl "The young" Wolter, dealing with building material. The eclectic facade displays interesting details: a bossage flanking the avant-corps, columns framing all first floor windows, topped by arched pediments. Bossages are mainly flanking second floor windows. The frontispiece capping the avant-corps is adorned with a male figure (Hermes?).

Ernst Bartsch tenement, at 79
Built in 1898-1899 by Fritz Weidner

Eclecticism, Art Nouveau elements.

The whole facade is purposefully designed on asymmetry, which is a specific means for the architect Fritz Weidner to abandon the stucco decoration and arrangements of architectural elements. After 1945, the building facade has been partly reconstructed, removing the original secession decor.

The edifice shows similarities with House at Gdanska Str.91, also designed by Fritz Weidner.

Paul Storz Tenement, at 81
Registered on Kuyavian-Pomeranian Voivodeship heritage list: Nr.601311-Reg.A/1056, February 26, 1997.

Built in 1897

Eclecticism-Mannerism.

The building was constructed in 1897, for Paul Storz, a master carpenter. Initial address was Danzigerstraße 47.

Tenement at 83, corner with Świętojańska Street
Registered on Kuyavian-Pomeranian Voivodeship heritage list, Nr.601311-Reg.A/1056, February 26, 1997.

Built in 1890, by Józef Święcicki

Eclecticism.

The building at then Danzigerstraße 48 had Otto Riedel, a baker, as first landlord, until World War I.

Typical from Józef Święcicki, the style of both elevations boasts eclecticism, close to Neo-baroque in the richness of the details, among others: cartouches, wrought iron balconies, bossage, bay window capped with an ogee roof and round top corbel table openings.

Villa Carl Grosse, at 84
Registered on Kuyavian-Pomeranian Voivodeship heritage list, Nr.601311-Reg.A/1056, February 26, 1997

1898–1899, by Karl Bergner

German Historicism

In the 1920s, rumor told mistakenly that the villa belonged to Polish Apolonia Chalupiec.

Tenement at 85 
1897

Eclecticism, Neoclassicism

Initial address was Danzigerstraße 49, the edifice was owned by Hermann Buchholz, a secretary of the Prussian state railways, living at Johanis Straße 9 (now Swiętojańska Street).

The building has been refurbished in 2016–2017. Architectural details comprise pedimented windows, cartouches with motifs, a slight middle avant-corps and a large portal topped by a transom light.

Otto Riedl Tenement at 2 Świętojańska Street
1911–1912, by Paul Sellner

Modern architecture

In the 1930s, Vincent Bigoński has established here a bakery that operated till 2020.

Tenement at 86 
1887, by Józef Święcicki and Anton Hoffmann

Eclecticism & French Neo-Renaissance

Puttos and sirens stucco reliefs are mounted on the facade.

Villa Hugo Hecht, at 88/90
Registered on Kuyavian-Pomeranian Voivodeship heritage list, Nr.601315-Reg.A/137, March 19, 2004

1888–1889, by Józef Święcicki and Anton Hoffmann

French Neo-Renaissance

In 1900–1939, the owner was Hermann Dietz, activist and social worker physician.

Tenement at 89 
1880

Eclecticism, Neo-Renaissance.

The tenement at then Danzigerstraße 51, has been commissioned by Ludwig Rodemann who had a business in wood transportation (Firm "Rodemann & Wurl"). He lived at Danzigerstraße 33, now Gdańska 53.

The frontage, despite its lack of upkeep, features the following details: a Neo-Renaissance disposition of the openings, delicate cartouches on the bottom of first floor windows (displaying an eagle with two figures and floral motifs) and nice wrought iron balconies.

Tenement at 91 
1898–1899, by Fritz Weidner

Historicism

The building shows similarity with a neighbouring one, at 79, also designed by Fritz Weidner.

Hugo Hecht tenement, at 92/94
Registered on Kuyavian-Pomeranian Voivodeship heritage list, Nr.A/269/1, August 21, 1991

1889–1892, by Józef Święcicki

French Neo-Renaissance

Marshal Józef Piłsudski has been accommodated here in June 1921 during his stay in Bydgoszcz.

Carl Bradtke Tenement, at 93
Registered on Kuyavian-Pomeranian Voivodeship heritage list, Nr.A/269/1, August 21, 1991

1895–1896, by Józef Święcicki

German Historicism & rokoko elements

The house was built for a master stonecutter, Carl Bradtke. His initials, CB, appear in a cartouche set in an upper pediment.

Tenement at 95 
1912–1913, by Paul Sellner

Modern architecture

This tenement presents an early modernist style.

Stanisław Rolbieski tenement, at 96
1891–1892, by Józef Święcicki

Eclecticism & French Neo-Renaissance

It is the last edifice of a series of six ordered by Hugo Hecht and realized by Józef Święcicki.

Reinhold Zschiesche Tenement at 1 Chocimska Street
1885–1888, by Józef Święcicki and Anton Hoffmann

Eclecticism

Reinhold Zschiesche was a restaurateur who ran his business on the ground floor.

Tenement at 98, corner with 2 Chodkiewicza street 
Built 1932-1933 by Józef Grodzki

Modern architecture

This functionalist tenement, together with the opposite one at 100 Gdańska street, strongly contrasts with the ancient buildings of the main downtown thoroughfare. Renovated in the late 2010s, part of the original decor (door carpentry, metal balcony balustrades, ceramic tiles) is still preserved.

Tenement at 99 
1883

Eclecticism & Neoclassical Architecture

The tenement at then Danzigerstraße 56, has been commissioned by Adelheid Gaertner or Gärtner, a dyer. The edifice has been refurbished in 2012.

The eclectic facade displays neo-classical elements: perfect symmetry in the facade balance, decoration of the openings on each level (pediments, thin pilasters) and an interesting frontispiece overhanging the entrance, featuring a man head.

Adam Wysocki Tenement at 100, corner with Chodkiewicza street
Built in the 1935 by Paweł Wawrzon

Modern architecture

Adam Wysocki, running a business of chimney sweeping, commissioned the building in the early 1930s. Local architect was Paweł Wawrzon, from Bydgoszcz, living at 6 Kościuszki street.

Geometric features of the facades recall contemporary realizations in the city, especially those designed by Jan Kossowski or Bolesław Polakiewicz.

Carl Peschel tenement, at 101
Registered on Kuyavian-Pomeranian Voivodeship heritage list, Nr.A/11, October 12, 1999

1892–1893, by Józef Święcicki

Eclecticism & rokoko

The building was designed as a renting house and commercial area.

Johann Schauer tenement, at 107
1887, by F. Meyer

Eclecticism

Johann Schauer, house's first owner, was a tailor.

The building has been thoroughly restored in December 2018. One can appreciate the details of the motifs: in the adorned openings, in the cartouches, the upper frieze or the decorated lintel.

Rudolf Gehrke tenement, at 113, corner with Chocimska street
1886, by Józef Święcicki and Anton Hoffmann

Eclecticism & Neo-Renaissance.

The first owner was Reinhold Zschiesche, also owner at 1 Chocimska Street. In the eclectic decoration, Józef Święcicki used Neo-Renaissance details. The entrance from Gdańska Street is topped with a head figure in a cartouche. The tenement has been renovated in 2021.

Tenement at 115 
1887 by Józef Święcicki and Anton Hoffmann

Eclecticism, Neo-classicism.

Initial address was Danzigerstraße 65, the first landlord was a butcher, Johann Bordanowicz. The butcher shop remained in use till the outbreak of World War I.

The facade reflects neo-classical features, with pediments over first level windows and a festoon above the avant-corps entry. The main gate is a work of wrought iron and glass.

Tenement at 117 
1889

Eclecticism, Neo-classicism.

Initial address was Danzigerstraße 66: the first owner was Hermann Kisser, a baker, who had his shop on the ground floor.

The facade, renovated in 2019, displays neo-classical features, in particular round pediments above the windows of the first floor.

Villa Fritz Heroldt, at 119
Registered on Kuyavian-Pomeranian Voivodeship heritage list, Nr.A/11, October 12, 1999

1895–1896, by Fritz Weidner

Eclecticism & Neo-baroque

In the beginning of the 20th century, the Polish journalist and writer Antoni Chołoniewski (1872-1924) lived here.

Julius Kolander tenement, at 125
1890, by Józef Święcicki

Modern architecture

The original building at Danzigerstraße 70, now gone, was commissioned by Julius Kolander, a baker, to Józef Święcicki. The Neo-baroque tenement included two wings and a stable. The current edifice has been completed in 1996, with a modern style attempting to recall Art Nouveau buildings.

Kazimierz Figurski tenement, at 127
1900-1901

German Historicism

The shop on the ground floor displays a preserved decorative cast-iron column, part of the original design of Kasimir Figurski, merchant and innkeeper. The building bears the characteristics of a picturesque architecture. Above the main entrance is placed a head of a young woman with stylish and abundant hair. Roof tops of the facade are decorated with openwork wooden structure.

The building has been restored in 2021

Ernst Friebel tenement, at 130
1911, by Karl Gehrke

Modern architecture

The house was built on a commission from Ernst Friebel.

Tenement at 131
1890s 

Eclecticism

August Käding, a railway switchman was the first landlord.

One can highlight the triangular tympanum above the entrance, adorned with vegetal plaster motifs.

Tenement at 135 
1893, by Carl Rose

Modern architecture

First owner was a cabdriver, Wincent Swirski. Above the main entrance is placed a stylized head of a woman. A major overhaul happened in 2000.

Tenement at 137 
1886 by Józef Święcicki and Anton Hoffmann

Eclecticism & Neo-Renaissance

First owner of this house at then Danzigerstraße 71 was Gustav Stiehlau, restaurateur and locksmith. In 1900, the property moved to Kasimir Figurski, a merchant, owner of the tenement at Nr.127. The low edifice sets off from the surrounding tenement. However, its decoration is worth noticing by the richness of the delicate ornaments of pediments and cartouches.

Georg Weiss tenement, at 141
1906–1907, by Georg Weiss

Modern architecture

It was the second personal house of George Weiss, a master mason, after the one he built at 10 Libelta Street.

Tenement at 144
1890s 

Eclecticism

The tenement has been entirely renovated in 2017 by the firm "Moderator".

Military barracks, at 147
1884-1914

Timber framing

Approximatively 40 barrack buildings have been were built on the compound.

Former Officer's Mess 53, at 160
1880

Historicism.

The house, initially at Danzigerstraße 89 had as first landlord Paul Firch, listed as worker. At the end of the 19th century, it was the property of Albin Cohnfeld, a rentier, living at Dworcowa Street Nr.77. In 1906, it was used as an Officer's Mess till 1918 and the recreation of an independent Polish state. It then became the Polish Officer's Mess until World War II.

After a thorough renovation, it is now the seat of a Polish videogames company, "Vivid Game" This historicist house, now refurbished, reflects beautiful brick details. Most impressive are the crow-stepped gables.

Zdzisław Krzyszkowiak Stadium, at 163
1960, by Jerzy Hofmann and 2008

Seat of Bydgoszcz sporting club Zawisza.

Tenement at 188 
1930-1939

Modern architecture.

Initially, the building was supposed to billet officers.

War College building, at 190
1913–1914, by Arnold Hartmann, Robert Schlezinger

Eclecticism & Neo-baroque

Built as the seat of the German War College, the edifice housed during World War I a military hospital.

Pomeranian Army Museum at 2 Czerkaska Street
1973, by Zbigniew Kortas

Functionalism

The museum presents the military history of Pomerania and Kujawy from Greater Poland Uprising (1918–19) till today. After the transformation in 2010, the museum presents additional sets of equipment and weapons.
The institution inherited the tradition of a pre-war military museum operating since 1928, in the Cadet School for Non-Commissioned Officer in Bydgoszcz, housed in the War College building at Nr.190.
Main exhibition highlights of this ancient collection were, among others: elements from the room of the Teutonic Order great master ind Malbork; a blade and firearms from 18th-19th centuries; a diploma signed by king August III; a snuffbox donated by Napoleon on Elba Island; hair from Tadeusz Kościuszko. All these items, scattered during World War II, have never been recovered.

The contemporary building, located at Czerkaska street has been created by architect Zbigniew Kortas in 1973 was erected on a plot that belonged to the War College since 1913. 
In 2007, the Museum gained the status of state cultural institution, and in 2010, it has been transformed into a branch of the Army Museum, together with museums in Torun and Wroclaw.

Buildings at 208/238
1935-1939

Functionalism

This row of flats has been designed before the Second World War by different architects:
 Jan Kossowski (1898-1958), for plots 208 and 214 (1936-1938);
 Architects Kossowski, J. Trojanski, T. Krieger, M. Zablonski for the other plots.

Water Supply Station "Las Gdański", at 242
1900, by F. Marschall

Neo-Gothic

The water supply complex, established 1900, is still operative today.

See also

 Bydgoszcz
 Bydgoszcz Architects (1850-1970s)
 Fritz Weidner
 Józef Święcicki

References

External links
 Site of the Army Museum in Bydgoszcz 
 Site of Zawisza Bydgoszcz 
 Site of Vivid Games, at 160

Bibliography 
  
  
  
  
  

Cultural heritage monuments in Bydgoszcz
Streets and squares in Bydgoszcz
Villas in Bydgoszcz